Barrosoa is a genus of flowering plants in the family Asteraceae. All the species are endemic to South America:

Barrosoa apiculata (Gardner) R.M.King & H.Rob.
Barrosoa atlantica 
Barrosoa betonicaeformis 
Barrosoa betonicifolia R.M.King & H.Rob.
Barrosoa betoniciformis (DC.) R.M.King & H.Rob.
Barrosoa cabrerae (B.L.Rob.) R.M.King & H.Rob.
Barrosoa candolleana (Hook. & Arn.) R.M.King & H.Rob.
Barrosoa confluentis (B.L.Rob.) R.M.King & H.Rob.
Barrosoa grossedentata V.M.Badillo
Barrosoa metensis (B.L.Rob.) R.M.King & H.Rob.
Barrosoa organensis (Gardner) R.M.King & H.Rob.
Barrosoa ramboi (Cabrera) R.M.King & H.Rob.
Barrosoa trianae (B.L.Rob.) R.M.King & H.Rob.

References

Eupatorieae
Asteraceae genera
Flora of South America